Rita Vorperian (Armenian: Ռիթա Որբերեան) is a journalist, writer, translator, and researcher. She has served as teaching fellow and lecturer in Western Armenian at UCLA. She was the former executive director of the Armenian Relief Society in the Western United States from 1998 to 2005 and is currently the senior administrator.

Life and works
Of Armenian descent, Rita Vorperian was born in Aleppo, Syria and graduated from the local Karen Yeppe Armenian High School. She continued her studies at the St. Joseph University in Beirut where she studied Armenology. After moving to the United States, Vorperian enrolled and graduated UCLA, where she received Bachelor of Arts degree in Near Eastern Studies, Master's degree in Near Eastern Languages and Cultures, and a Doctoral Degree in the field of Armenian literature and literary criticism. Her dissertation is titled A Feminist Reading of Krikor Zohrab. She has a strong interest in feminist topics, about which she made many presentations and contributed articles in Armenian publications in the United States and abroad. She has been a senior lecturer in University of California, Los Angeles for seventeen years from 1983 to 2000.

She has been an active journalist and has submitted to many Armenian newspapers such as Aztag (daily) in Beirut, Azat Or in Greece, Asbarez in Los Angeles, Artsakank in Cyprus, and Hairenik in Watertown, Massachusetts. She has also contributed to Pakine in Beirut with literary works.

She was one of the moderators for the University of California, Los Angeles World Conference in Contemporary Armenian Literature on April 7–8, 2011.

She speaks seven languages including Armenian, French, Arabic, Turkish, English, Spanish and Russian. She is a translator of numerous Armenian books such as Javakhk: A World That Cares by Jennifer Salmassian.

She is also one of the founding members of the Western United States branch of the Armenian Hamazkayin Cultural Organization.

Recognition
On March 25, 2011, she was awarded the prestigious Mesrob Mashtots Medal, the highest award for culture in Armenia, from the Archbishop of the Western Prelate of the Armenian church on behalf of Aram I, Catholicos of the Holy See of Cilicia for her literary accomplishments and dedication to the Armenian community.

On March 20, 2002 during the second session of the 107th Congress of the House of Representatives, Representative Adam Schiff awarded Rita Vorperian with the Woman of the Year award of the 27th Congressional district for her accomplishments as a humanitarian and advocate for women's rights.

Business Life magazine has recognized and honored her as a "Woman of Achievement".

References

People from Aleppo
American people of Armenian descent
American feminists
Armenian-language writers
Ethnic Armenian translators
Living people
Year of birth missing (living people)
Syrian people of Armenian descent
Syrian emigrants to the United States
20th-century American women writers
21st-century American women writers
20th-century American writers
21st-century American writers
University of California, Los Angeles alumni
University of California, Los Angeles faculty